Kairamo is a surname. Notable people with the surname include:

Kari Kairamo (1932–1988), Finnish Nokia chairman
Oswald Kairamo (1858–1938), Finnish politician and botanist
Päivi Kairamo (born 1964), Finnish diplomat

Finnish-language surnames